Dhanna Bhagat, also known Dhanna Jaat or Dhanna Jatt, Dhanna Bairagi, Sant Dhanna (born 1415) was a mystic poet and a Vaishnav devotee whose three hymns are present in Guru Granth Sahib.

Early life
He was born in the village of Chouru in Tehsil Phagi, in the Jaipur district of Rajasthan in a Hindu Jat family of Dhaliwal clan, India. and was disciple of bhakti poet-sant Guru Ramananda.

Divine powers
There are a number of mystical stories about the divine powers of Dhanna Bhagat. One such states that once he was ploughing his fields, a large number of sanyasis (Hindu religious mendicants) came to him hungry and sought food. Dhanna Bhagat gave them all the seeds he had kept for sowing his fields, and ploughed the fields without sowing seeds.  The fields produced no food grains, but gourds. When his Jagirdar (land-owner) came to collect the levy, Dhanna Bhagat offered two gourds.  Surprised and insulted, the Jagirdar broke the gourds in anger, only to find that they were full of pearls.  Bhakti-saint Meera refers to this story in her poem, "sun lijo binati mori, main sharan gahi prabhu teri".

Popular culture
Indian filmmaker Kidar Nath Sharma made Dhanna Bhagat in 1945 which starred Kamal Zamindar in the titular role. In 1974, Bhagat Dhanna Jatt, an Indian Punjabi-language film starring Dara Singh, was released.

References

Sahib Sirigh, Bhagat-BaniSati`k, vol. I. Amritsar, 1979

External links
Bhagat Dhanna Gurudwara

People from Rajasthan
Hindu mystics
Hindu poets
1415 births
Year of death unknown